Chinna Muthu is a 1994 Indian Tamil-language action drama film written and directed by Shanmuga Sundaram in his debut. The film stars Radha Ravi in the title role with Rajeev, Y. G. Mahendran,  Vaishnavi, Chandrasekhar in supporting roles. It was released on 19 February 1994.

Plot

Cast 
Radha Ravi as Chinna Muthu
Rajeev as Mookaiyan
 Vaishnavi
Padmashri
Ravikanth
Y. G. Mahendran
Chandrasekhar
Roopesh Raj as Thangarasu
Asha as Shenbagam

Production 
Chinna Muthu marked the directorial debut of Shanmuga Sundaram, who earlier worked as a dialogue writer for Annaamalai (1992). Radha Ravi played the title role, and it was his third film which he had produced under his production company.

Soundtrack 
Soundtrack was composed by Deva, with lyrics by Vairamuthu.

Release and reception 
Chinna Muthu was released on 19 February 1994. Malini Mannath of The Indian Express gave a negative review, criticising Radha Ravi because "he indulged in a lot of over-acting" and that his earlier productions were "much better efforts".

References

External links 
 

1990s action drama films
1990s Tamil-language films
1994 directorial debut films
1994 films
Films scored by Deva (composer)
Indian action drama films